SCIT may refer to:

Subcutaneous immunotherapy (SCIT)
Symbiosis Centre for Information Technology
Social cognition and interaction training (SCIT)